Tri-County Technical College is a public community college in Pendleton, South Carolina.  It is part of the South Carolina Technical College System.  Established in 1962, Tri-County Technical College has four campuses in Pendleton, Anderson, Easley, and Seneca, serving Anderson, Oconee, and Pickens counties.  The college has a partnership with nearby Clemson University to allow students who plan to declare a limited enrollment major or missing college-level credits at Clemson to enroll at Tri-County and transfer to Clemson after two semesters whilst holding status as Clemson Students.

References

External links
Official website

South Carolina Technical College System
Educational institutions established in 1962
Pendleton, South Carolina
Education in Anderson County, South Carolina
Education in Oconee County, South Carolina
Education in Pickens County, South Carolina
Universities and colleges accredited by the Southern Association of Colleges and Schools